Bsaba (pronounced: BSE-ba), also written as Bessaba, Bisaba, Bisābā, Bseba El Chouf, is a village in Chouf District, Lebanon. Bsaba is a member of Federation of South Iqlim El Kharroub Municipalities.

Bsaba is known for its temperature, views and farming culture.

Bsaba turned from a population of mainly farmers to a village of doctors, engineers, lawyers, judges, Lebanese law enforcement members, and some members of the Lebanese state, some of whom enjoy farming as a past time, not straying far from their roots.

Bsaba is hailed as the "jewel of Lebanon's mountain", with a great climate all year round. Bsaba natives tend to live in the cities of Lebanon, usually going to Bsaba during weekends and vacations.

References

External links
Bsaba, Localiban

Populated places in Chouf District
Sunni Muslim communities in Lebanon